Matthew Scully (born March 30, 1959) is an American author, journalist, and political writer who has also written on animal welfare.

Early life

Scully was born in Casper, Wyoming and lived his childhood throughout Colorado, Ohio, and New York,.  He attended Arizona State University in the 1980s. He married Emmanuelle Boers in 1998. And in 2008 when Matthew was working for Sarah Palin in the McCain campaign. After John McCain lost to Barack Obama, they moved back to Los Angeles, California. Then in 2013 they moved to a Suburb of Phoenix, Arizona and currently live there.

Career

Scully worked as a speechwriter in the 2000 presidential campaign, and served as a special assistant and senior speechwriter for President George W. Bush from January 2001 to August 2004. He also wrote speeches for vice-presidents Dan Quayle, Dick Cheney, and Mike Pence. Governor Robert P. Casey of Pennsylvania, and Bob Dole.

In an article in The Atlantic, Scully accused former White House chief speechwriter Michael Gerson of wrongfully taking credit for speeches written by Scully and other members of President George W. Bush's speechwriting team. Scully served as literary editor of National Review and has written for The New York Times, The Wall Street Journal, The Washington Post, The Los Angeles Times, The Atlantic Monthly, and The American Conservative.

Palin acceptance speech

Prior to the 2008 Republican National Convention, Senator John McCain (the Republican presidential nominee to-be) asked Scully to write the acceptance speech for his vice presidential nominee, whom McCain had not yet chosen. Scully wrote the speech two weeks before the convention. He wrote the speech for a man to deliver, not a woman. Four days before the convention, Scully was surprised when he was informed that Alaska Governor Sarah Palin was to be McCain's running mate. Scully then worked all night to tailor the speech to Palin and also to incorporate new campaign strategy shifts that were being rapidly formed in intensive discussions by McCain campaign staff.

Palin delivered the 40-minute speech at the convention on September 3, 2008.

Melania Trump 2016 convention speech
Scully was hired along with John McConnell to write "the biggest speech of Melania Trump’s life," to be delivered on July 18, 2016, at the 2016 Republican National Convention.   Scully and McConnell sent Ms. Trump a draft a month before the convention; however, one of Ms. Trump's writers rewrote most of the speech herself, inserting "word-for-word repetition of phrases" from Michelle Obama's speech at the 2008 Democratic National Convention, leading to focused criticism of the writer.

Animal welfare

Scully is the author of Dominion: The Power of Man, the Suffering of Animals, and the Call to Mercy (2002), described by Natalie Angier in a review published in The New York Times (October 27, 2002) as a "horrible, wonderful, important book... because the author, an avowed America First conservative Republican and former speechwriter for George W. Bush, is an unexpected defender of the animals against the depredations of profit driven corporations, swaggering, proponents of renewed 'harvesting' of whales and elephants and others who insist that all of nature is humanity's romper room, to play with, rearrange, and plunder at will." Nichols Fox in a review published in The Washington Post wrote that Dominion is "destined to become a classic defense of mercy."

As a conservative Christian Scully argues that mankind has dominion over animals but should be compassionate and merciful in their treatment towards them. He argues from a Christian animal welfare position and is not an animal rights activist. Scully argues against the philosophies of "no-pain theorists" who hold that animals are not conscious or do not feel pain, including Stephen Budiansky, Peter Carruthers and David Oderberg. The book strongly argues against using animals for food (factory farming) and sport (hunting). The book was positively reviewed in the journal Animal Law, which noted that "Dominion asks tough questions and forces us to face the reality of civilization's needless cruelty toward animals."

Selected publications
 
 Scully wrote a chapter ("Fear factories: the case for conservatism for animals") of the book "CAFO (concentrated animal feeding operation): the tragedy of industrial animal factories" (Daniel Imhoff, editor). San Rafael, California : Earth Aware, c2010.

References

External links

 "Animal Cruelty and Need for Reform", online discussion with Matthew Scully, Washington Post, August 25, 2004

1959 births
Living people
American animal welfare scholars
American male journalists
American male non-fiction writers
American political writers
American speechwriters
American veganism activists
California Republicans
People from Casper, Wyoming
Writers from California
Writers from Wyoming
Wyoming Republicans